Adesmus laetus is a species of beetle in the family Cerambycidae. It was described by Henry Walter Bates in 1881. It is known from Colombia, Peru, and Venezuela.

References

Adesmus
Beetles described in 1881